The prime minister of Pakistan (romanized: Wazīr ē Aʿẓam) is the head of government of the Islamic Republic of Pakistan. Executive authority is vested in the prime minister and his chosen cabinet, despite the president of Pakistan serving as the nominal head of executive. The prime minister is often the leader of the party or the coalition with a majority in the lower house of the Parliament of Pakistan, the National Assembly where he serves as  Leader of the House. Prime minister holds office by virtue of their ability to command the confidence of the National Assembly. The prime minister is designated as the "Chief Executive of the Islamic Republic".

Pakistan's prime minister leads the executive branch of the federal government, oversees the state economy, leads the National Assembly, heads the Council of Common Interests as well as the Cabinet, and is charged with leading the National Command Authority over Pakistan's nuclear weapons arsenal. This position places its holder in leadership of the nation and in control over all matters, both internal affairs and foreign policy. The prime minister is elected by the members of the National Assembly and is therefore usually the leader of the majority party in the parliament. The Constitution of Pakistan vests executive powers in the prime minister, who is responsible for appointing the Cabinet as well as running the executive branch, taking and authorizing executive decisions, appointments, and recommendations that require prime ministerial confirmation.

Constitutionally, the prime minister serves as the chief adviser to the president of Pakistan on critical matters; and plays an influential role in appointment in each branch of the military leadership as well as ensuring civilian control of the military through chairman joint chiefs, although this does not necessarily happen in tandem. Prime ministerial powers have significantly grown with a delicate system of check and balance by each branch. The position was absent during the years of 1958–1973, 1977–1985, and 1999–2002 due to imposed martial law. In each of these periods, the military junta led by the president had the powers of the prime minister.

History

The office of the prime minister was created on immediate effect after the partition and the establishment of Pakistan in 1947; the prime minister existed alongside the governor-general who was the representative of the British monarchy. The first prime minister, Liaquat Ali Khan, exercised central executive powers until his assassination in 1951. The powers slowly began to be reduced as a result of constant intervention by the governor-general. Despite the first set of the Constitution giving central power in 1956, the next six prime ministers were dismissed by the governor-general from 1951 till 1957. The first set of the Constitution had evolved the governor-general into the president of Pakistan whilst declaring the country an "Islamic republic". In 1958, President Iskandar Mirza dismissed the seventh prime minister to impose martial law in a mere two weeks, President Mirza was ousted by army chief General Ayub Khan who had for a brief period held the post of Prime Minister.

In 1962, the second set of the Constitution completely dissolved the office of prime minister as all powers were transferred to the president of Pakistan. Criticism over the presidency after the presidential election held in 1965 over the centralizing of powers. After the general elections held in 1970, the office was established with Nurul Amin becoming the prime minister who was also the vice-president. Negotiations that fall apart between Zulfikar Ali Bhutto, Mujibur Rehman, and Yahya Khan that prompted to liberation movement in the East Pakistan. With India intervening in East Pakistan and Pakistan conceding defeat to end the war led to the collapse of the presidential system in 1971.

As the comprehensive Constitution reinstated in 1973, the post was reestablished with more central powers as the constitution provided a parliamentary system with President of Pakistan as figurehead. Amid agitation instigated by the right-wing alliance invited the military intervention in 1977 which suspended the post.

The general elections held in 1985 restored the post, with Muhammad Junejo becoming the prime minister. Later that year, the National Assembly passed the controversial eighth amendment to the Constitution, giving the president the power to dismiss the prime minister and the National Assembly without prior consultation. The general elections in 1988 resulted in the Pakistan Peoples Party's Benazir Bhutto becoming the first woman prime minister elected in a Muslim country.

From 1988 to 1993, the power struggle between the prime minister and presidency continued with the president dismissing the National Assembly on three different occasions. At the 1997 elections, the PML(N) secured a two-thirds majority in the Parliament and drafted the XIII and XIV Amendments to reverse the eighth amendment to the Constitution; this allowed Nawaz Sharif to centralize more executive powers. After the draw down of civil-military relations in 1999, Chairman joint chiefs General Pervez Musharraf staged a coup d'état against the PML(N)'s government and held nationwide elections in 2002.

With no party gaining a majority, a coalition was formed with the PML(Q) – a breakaway of the PML(N) and a pro-Musharraf party – leading with MQM. After some political wrangling, Zafarullah Jamali became the prime minister, and passed the XVII amendment which partially restored the power of the president to dissolve the National Assembly, but made the dissolution subject to the Supreme Court of Pakistan's approval.

Over the authority issues, Prime Minister Jamali resigned in 2004 and Shaukat Aziz was eventually appointed as Prime Minister, securing 151 out of 191 votes in the National Assembly. The XVII amendment featured a semi-presidential system allowing the presidency to keep the interference executive and the judiciary. The general elections in 2008 resulted in the PPP coming to power and supporting the movement to oust Pervez Musharraf. A populist intellectual movement leading to the departure of Pervez Musharraf allowed Asif Zardari to become president. In 2010, the XVIII Amendment to the Constitution of Pakistan was passed to reverse the XVII amendment; it returned the country to being a parliamentary democratic republic. The XVIII Amendment removed all powers of the presidency to dissolve the Parliament unilaterally and sweep away the powers amassed by the former presidents Pervez Musharraf and Zia-ul-Haq to maintain a delicate check and balance.

Following a contempt of court case, the Supreme Court permanently disqualified Prime Minister Yousuf Raza Gillani. Originally, the PPP nomination was Makhdoom Shahbuddin, but he was forced to withdraw after the ANF issued non-bailable arrest warrants against him. Raja Pervaiz Ashraf became the prime minister and remained in office until 2013. The general election held in 2013 saw the PML(N) almost achieve a supermajority. Following this, Nawaz Sharif was elected as Prime Minister, returning to the post for the third time after a fourteen-year absence, in a democratic transition. In July 2017, Nawaz Sharif disqualified as prime minister following corruption charges against him resulting from Panama papers leak which also forced Iceland prime minister to resign.

On 18 August 2018, Imran Khan was sworn in as the country's 22nd prime minister. On 10 April 2022, a constitutional crisis culminated in Khan losing a motion of no confidence with 174 votes cast against him, ending his premiership and making him the first Prime Minister of Pakistan to be removed from office through a motion of no confidence.

On 11th April 2022, Shehbaz Sharif was elected as the country's 23rd Prime Minister. He won by majority 174 votes in the National Assembly of Pakistan.  Sharif will serve a term, at most of almost one year to fulfill Imran Khan's term until the 2023 Pakistani General Election, though the election may be called earlier.

Constitutional law

The Constitution envisages a scheme of affairs in which the president of Pakistan is the head of state who represents the "unity of the Republic." The system of government in Pakistan is based on codified constitution which sees the prime minister as "chief executive of the Republic."

The prime minister is also the chairman of the Council of Common Interests as set by:

As in most of the parliamentary democracies, a head of state's duties are mostly ceremonial. The prime minister of Pakistan is the head of government and has the responsibility for executive power. With Pakistan following a parliamentary system of government, the Prime minister is generally the leader of a party (or coalition of parties) that has a majority in the National Assembly —the lower house of the Parliament of Pakistan. The prime minister, in common with all other ministers, has to be a member of National Assembly.

Role and powers

The principal workplace of the prime minister is the Prime Minister's Office located in northeast Islamabad. The official residence, known as Prime Minister Enclave, is near the Prime Minister's Office. The prime minister is the chief executive who heads and exercises the authority of the Government of Pakistan. After obtaining a vote of confidence, the prime minister is invited by the president to take the oath of office and form the government. In practice, the prime minister nominates the members of the Cabinet who supervise the important functions and ministries of the Government of Pakistan and communicates to the president all decisions of the Cabinet relating to the administration of affairs of state and proposals for legislation.

The prime minister, in consultation with the Cabinet, schedules and attends the sessions of the Parliament and is required to answer questions from members of parliament to the ministers.
The prime minister makes appointments on various important positions, including:
 The federal secretaries as head of cabinet-level ministries
 The chief secretaries of the provinces
 Key administrative and military personnel in the Pakistan Armed Forces
 The chairmen of large public sector organisations and corporations such as NHA, PIA, PNSC etc.
 The chairmen and other members of the federal commissions and public institutions
 Ambassadors and High Commissioners to other countries

Some specific ministries are usually allocated to the prime minister:
 Planning Commission
 National Command Authority
 National Security Council
 Economic Coordination Committee
 Cabinet Committee on National Security

The prime minister is vested with command authority over the Pakistani nuclear arsenals and represents the country in various delegations, high-level meetings, and international organisations that require the attendance of the highest government office and also addresses the nation on various issues of national importance.

Eligibility
The Constitution of Pakistan requires that the prime minister be a member of the National Assembly. As well as this, one must:
 be a citizen of Pakistan.
 be a Muslim
 be above 25 years of age
 be able to prove good conduct of character and be not commonly known to violate Islamic injunctions
 have adequate knowledge of Islamic teachings and practice obligatory duties prescribed by Islam, as well as abstaining from major sins
 have not, after the establishment of Pakistan, worked against the integrity of the country or opposed the ideology of Pakistan.

Selection and removal
The candidates for the prime minister are members of the National Assembly who were chosen through direct elections by popular vote following campaigning on the party platforms. Usually, the leader of the majority party in the parliament retains the office of prime minister, and forms the government either by coalition or by simple majority. The candidate must retain the vote of confidence of the members of the parliament before being invited by the president to form the government.

The prime minister can be removed before the expiry of the term through a vote of no confidence in the parliament. If the vote of no confidence is passed by the National Assembly by a simple majority, the prime minister ceases to retain the office. In the past, prime ministers (and their governments) have been dismissed by the president exercising the VIII Amendment to the Constitution of Pakistan (1985), but this was repealed by the XVIII Amendment to the Constitution of Pakistan (2010). The prime minister has absolute constitutional immunity from criminal and civil proceedings, and no proceedings can be initiated or continued against him during the term of his office.

In 2012, the Supreme Court of Pakistan has ceased at least one prime minister from retaining the office due to contempt of court after retroactively disqualifying the membership of the parliament permanently.

On 28 July 2017, the Supreme Court of Pakistan disqualified the prime minister Nawaz Sharif from retaining the office due to his failure in fulfilling the eligibility requirements as enshrined in Articles 62 of the Constitution. This was in the aftermath of the Supreme Court hearing regarding the Panama Papers Case. This also resulted in him being permanently disqualified from membership of the parliament.

The prime minister is elected by the National Assembly. The National Assembly meets on the twenty-first day after a general election (at least every five years) unless the president calls for a vote of no confidence. Whichever member of the National assembly is chosen serves as the prime minister until the next election or until he fails to maintain the confidence of the National Assembly.

Oath of office
The prime minister is required to make and subscribe to, in the presence of the president, an oath or affirmation that they shall protect, preserve and defend the Constitution as follows:

List

See also
 Principal Secretary to the Prime Minister of Pakistan
 Air transports of heads of state and government
 Federal Secretary
 Grade 22
 Deputy Prime Minister of Pakistan
 List of prime ministers of Pakistan
 Prime Minister House, Pakistan

Notes

References

Further reading

External links
 Profile on the website of the government of Pakistan

Politics of Pakistan
 
Parliament of Pakistan
1947 establishments in Pakistan